The Casa da Música is a concert hall in Porto, Portugal. It was designed by architect Rem Koolhaas and opened in 2005.

Designed to mark the festive year of 2001 in which the city of Porto was designated European Capital of Culture, it was the first building in Portugal aimed from its conception to be exclusively dedicated to music, either in public performances or in the field of artistic training and creation.

Casa da Música's project was set in motion in 1999 as a result of an international architecture tender won by the project presented by Rem Koolhaas - Office for Metropolitan Architecture. Ground was broken in 1999 at the old tram terminus station in Boavista roundabout (Rotunda da Boavista), and Casa da Musica was inaugurated on 15 April 2005.

History

On 1 September 1998, the Ministro da Cultura (Ministry of Culture) announced the construction of Casa da Música, during the ambit of Porto's 2001 tenure as the European Capital of Culture.

The building engineers were AFA Arup Group Limited (London), together with Afassociados (Porto). It was designed by Dutch architect Rem Koolhaas, in association with the Porto Office of Metropolitan Architecture, the scene agency Ducks scéno, the acoustician Renz Van Luxemburg and AFA, while the interiors were designed by Inside Outside (Petra Blaisse).

Its location was decided on 8 March 1999, on a municipal tract of Boavista. The site was once a staging area for trams. Construction occurred in the next four years over schedule, and cost 100 million euros. The project challenged engineers because of the building's unusual configuration.

It was open to the public on 14 April 2005, with performances by Clã and Lou Reed, while the official inauguration occurred the next day in the presence of the Portuguese president, prime minister, other notable politicians and members of Portuguese society, with a concert by the Orquestra Nacional do Porto (Porto National Orchestra). It immediately became a city icon. Featuring a 1300-seat auditorium suffused with daylight, it is the only concert hall in the world with two walls made entirely of glass.

On 5 November 2005, an administrative process was begun to classify the building as Imóvel de Interesse Público (Property of Public Interest).

The building's design was acclaimed worldwide. Nicolai Ouroussoff, architecture critic from The New York Times, called it the "most attractive project the architect Rem Koolhaas has ever built" and indicated that it is "a building whose intellectual ardor is matched by its sensual beauty". He also compared it to the "exuberant design" in Frank Gehry's Guggenheim Museum in Bilbao, Spain. "Only looking into the original aspect of the building, this is one of the most important concert halls built in the last 100 years". He compares it to the Walt Disney Concert Hall, in Los Angeles, and the Berliner Philharmonie.

A foundation, the Fundação Casa da Música, was instituted on 26 January 2006 under decree 16/2006. But, in reference to its classification, the process was archived on 15 March 2011.

In September 2008, the Casa da Música hosted the Orquestra Nacional do Porto, which took part in exploratory public presentations in which music was captured alongside the musicians' and conductor's expressive gestures. Various sensor networks sourced and translated musical expressions into computer-driven visual interpretations (which included lighting, projected images, and real-time improvisations). Scientific articles were also published on special-needs performances and workshops in the Casa da Música in 2007 and 2008.

Architecture

The building is shaped as a nine-floor-high asymmetrical polyhedron covered in plaques of white cement, cut by large undulated or plane glass windows. The building is accessible through a front stairway and stands at the center of a vast open plaza of marble, yellow with hint of brown.  Its isolated architectural form, deeply set back from adjacent streets, including the main Avenida da Boavista, and from the city's prime ceremonial public space, the Praça Mouzinho de Albuquerque, is evocative of the hull of a ship beached at low tide. It deliberately ignores and challenges the neoclassical order of converging avenues and the vast oval of continuous blocks centered on a tall monument, Heroes of the Peninsular War, that has defined the Praça.

See also
 World Architecture Survey

References

Sources

External links

 Casa da Música
 Office for Metropolitan Architecture
 Petra Blaisse's Inside Outside

2005 establishments in Portugal
Tourist attractions in Porto
Music venues in Portugal
Concert halls in Portugal
Theatres and concert halls in Porto
Rem Koolhaas buildings
Ove Arup buildings and structures
Music venues completed in 2005